Nativity of Our Lord Catholic Church is one of the oldest churches in Chicago, Illinois, founded in 1868. The church was designed by noted architect Patrick Keely, an architectural designer prominent throughout the 19th century.  He also designed Holy Name Cathedral in downtown Chicago.

Nativity of Our Lord Parish is part of the Roman Catholic Archdiocese of Chicago and is located in the city's Bridgeport neighborhood. Prominent church members include former Chicago Mayors Richard J. Daley and Richard M. Daley, as well as William M. Daley, former U.S. Secretary of Commerce and Chief of Staff for the Obama Administration, and former State Senator and Representative and current Cook County Commissioner John P. Daley.

Historical background 
Nativity of Our Lord Parish was founded in 1868, to serve Irish Catholics who lived near the Union Stockyards. Bishop Thomas Foley appointed Rev. Michael Lyons to organize the new parish. Father Lyons purchased the J. McPherson Livery Stables at the northeast corner of Halsted and Egan (39th Street), which was at that time the southern border of the City of Chicago.  The new parish was appropriately named "Nativity Church," since Christ was also born in a stable.  It was dedicated on Palm Sunday, April 5, 1868. The parish grew and Rev. Jeremiah S. O'Neill was named to succeed Father Lyons. With the support of the parish, he acquired 15 lots at the corner of 37th and Dashiel (now Union Avenue) to construct the present church.

In 1874, Reverend Joseph M. Cartan was named pastor and quickly set about the work of building a greater parish and improving the lives of those who lived in Bridgeport. Father Cartan laid the cornerstone for the current church in 1876. Construction continued at a slow and steady pace. It was not until almost three years later that the lower church hall was finished sufficiently to hold services. On December 5, 1885, over nine years after the cornerstone was laid, Archbishop Patrick Feehan dedicated Nativity of Our Lord Church. It was not until the following summer that decorating and final construction details were completed. The cost of the church was reported at $70,000.

Architecture 
The church was designed by Patrick Keely, who was a prolific designer contributing to over 600 churches in the United States. Other notable works by Keely include Holy Name Cathedral in Chicago, The Basilica of the Sacred Heart at Notre Dame University and the Cathedral of the Holy Cross in Boston.

Stained glass 

Integral to the beauty and warmth of Nativity is the warm, muted light that bathes the interior of the church. Over 185 stained glass windows provide beauty and illumination. Every façade contains stained glass. The fact that the church is intimate and inviting in spite of its considerable mass is due in large part to the warmth these windows bring.

Church records indicate that the current windows were installed in 1907 under the direction of then pastor Rev. James J. Flaherty. The windows can be divided into three primary sets: the nave windows lining the east and west walls of the church, the three windows above the narthex and the windows above the three front entrances. There are dozens of additional windows in the sacristy, the bell tower, and throughout the church. The windows are constructed with gothic patterns that show art nouveau influences. Most major panels have a unique round inset that features a classic, Munich-style stained glass with a religious symbol.

Through the generosity of many parishioners, these 168 heavenly and historic windows were restored to their original grandeur in 2010-2011, as the final phase of a five-year parish improvement process.

Pastors 
 Rev. Michael Lyons		1868–1871
 Rev. Jeremiah S. O’Neill	1871–1884
 Rev. Joseph M Cartan		1884–1907
 Rev. James J Flaherty		1907–1922
 Rev. Patrick C Conway		1922–1943
 Rev. Philip Hayes		1943–1949
 Rev. William I Murray		1949–1955
 Rev. Walter Lanus		1956–1960
 Rev. Michael J Conway		1960–1973
 Rev. John J Lydon		1973–1978
 Rev. Edward P O’Brien	        1978–1990
 Rev. James P Kehoe		1990–2005
 Rev. Daniel J Brandt		2005–2011
 Rev. Joseph Altman		2011–present

References

Further reading 
 Conway, Reverend Michael J. Nativity of Our Lord, Roman Catholic Church. Progress Printing, 1961.
 Conway, Reverend Michael J. 100 Years Celebration. Progress Printing, 1968.
 Brandt, Reverend Daniel J. Nativity of Our Lord Parish, Celebrating 140 Years in our Faith. Life Touch Printing, 2008.

External links 
 
 Nativity of Our Lord Parish
 Bridgeport Catholic Academy
 Archdiocese of Chicago

Bridgeport, Chicago
Roman Catholic churches in Chicago
Gothic Revival church buildings in Illinois
Irish-American culture in Chicago
Patrick Keely buildings
1868 establishments in Illinois
Roman Catholic churches completed in 1868
19th-century Roman Catholic church buildings in the United States